Colin Gordon (born 8 July 1960) is a Jamaican cricketer. He played in four first-class matches for the Jamaican cricket team in 1982/83.

See also
 List of Jamaican representative cricketers

References

External links
 

1960 births
Living people
Jamaican cricketers
Jamaica cricketers
Place of birth missing (living people)